Spectral decomposition is any of several things:

 Spectral decomposition for matrix: eigendecomposition of a matrix
 Spectral decomposition for linear operator: spectral theorem
Decomposition of spectrum (functional analysis)